Live at the Blue Note is the first recording of the acoustic jazz sextet Origin featuring Chick Corea on piano. The album was recorded during a week-long gig in December 1997.

Track listing 
 "Say It Again, Pt. 1" (Corea) – 1:30
 "Say It Again, Pt. 2" (Corea) – 1:29
 "Double Image" (Corea) – 17:31
 "Dreamless" (Corea) – 10:53
 "Molecules" (Corea) – 11:26
 "Soul Mates" (Corea) – 9:00
 "It Could Happen to You" (Johnny Burke, Jimmy Van Heusen) – 13:34

Personnel 
Musicians
 Chick Corea – piano
 Avishai Cohen – double bass
 Adam Cruz – drums
 Bob Sheppard – flute, bass clarinet, baritone saxophone, soprano saxophone, tenor saxophone
 Steve Wilson – flute, clarinet, alto and soprano saxophone
 Steve Davis – trombone

Production
 Chick Corea – producer, liner notes, executive producer, artwork, mixing
 Ron Moss – executive producer, photography
 Eric Seijo – engineer
 Bernie Kirsh – engineer (mixing)
 Alan Yoshida – engineer (mastering)
 Tom Banghart – assistant engineer
 Jordan d'Alessio – assistant engineer
 Darren Mora – assistant engineer
 Robert Read – assistant engineer
 Evelyn Brechtlein – project coordinator

Chart performance

References 

Chick Corea live albums
1998 live albums
Albums recorded at the Blue Note Jazz Club